= Kvertus =

- Industry: Arms industry
- Founded: 2017
- Headquarters: Ukraine
- Key people: Andrii Znaichenko (Founder and Co-owner); Yaroslav Filimonov (Chief Executive Officer, Co-owner); Serhii Skoryk (Commercial Director)
- Products: development and production of electronic warfare and electronic intelligence equipment

Kvertus is a Ukrainian company specializing in the development and production of electronic warfare (EW) and electronic intelligence (ELINT) equipment.

== General information ==
The company manufactures equipment used to protect military, civilian and critical infrastructure.

It was founded in 2017. The company's first anti-drone products appeared in the same year. The company specializes in the development and production of electronic warfare and reconnaissance systems and unmanned aerial vehicle (UAV) defense systems.

It is a member of the National Defense Industry Association of Ukraine.

At the EDEX 2023 exhibition, the company presented a variety of counter-drone systems such as the AD Hunter jamming system, the AD G-6+ anti-drone gun, and the portable AD Counter FPV, which is also produced in a backpack variant.

In 2023, Kvertus and the Kruk UAV Operator Training Center signed a cooperation agreement to launch a training course. Kvertus provides the training center with electronic warfare equipment of its own design and production, and will repair it if necessary. Kruk provides instructors. Thus, military and civilians will be able to learn how to work with trench electronic warfare equipment.

In 2023, the company received the award “CHOICE OF THE YEAR #1” 2023 in the nomination “Development and production of defense and security systems (military and civilian)”.

In 2024, the company saw an increase in the share of public procurement. In 2022, 80% of Kvertus products were purchased by charitable foundations and businesses, while now 85% of sales are made to government agencies, military units, and local communities.

The company is actively investing in its developments, such as the KVERTUS MS AZIMUTH system, LTEJ MIRAGE and AD BERSERK.

According to the Militarny Portal, more than 50 manufacturers in Ukraine are currently working on electronic warfare (EW) and electronic intelligence (ELINT) systems. However, Kvertus is recognized as the largest publicly traded company in the Ukrainian electronic warfare industry. The manufacturer's specialty is that the entire line of products is in service with the Armed Forces of Ukraine, all of which are codified according to NATO standards. The company is an official supplier of equipment to all law enforcement agencies: The Armed Forces, the National Guard, the National Police, the Security Service, and the State Border Guard Service.

Kvertus, a Ukrainian developer and manufacturer of electronic warfare and intelligence equipment, independently tests its own products. The company's developers traveled to test the equipment as close to the front line as possible. They were near Kostyantynivka, Toretske, Pokrovs’k and Druzhkivka in Donetsk region, as well as in some other settlements in this area. There, the team tested the equipment of VEPR M100, KVERTUS AD KRAKEN, AD HUNTER, AD COUNTER FPV and AD COUNTER FPV BACKPACK, KVERTUS AD MW and KVERTUS AD G-6+.

At the World Defense Show 2024 (WDS 2024) exhibition in Saudi Arabia, the National Association of Ukrainian Defense Industries (NAUDI) is displaying various counter-drone systems developed by the Ukrainian company Kvertus Technology. These systems encompass the AD G-6+ anti-drone gun and the portable AD Counter-FPV in its backpack variant.

In 2024, during the exhibition dedicated to anti-drone technologies “Protecting the Warrior from Drones”, the Ukrainian manufacturer of electronic countermeasures Kvertus presented an airborne version of the Azimuth electronic intelligence system. The main task of the complex, called Aero Azimuth, is to show the location of enemy drone crews for various purposes for their further fire damage to destroy or terminate the mission.

Kvertus, Ukraine’s leading electronic warfare (EW) systems manufacturer, has announced a significant contract with “Ukrainian Armor”, the country’s largest private machine-building company. Starting in 2025, Kvertus will equip all armored vehicles produced by “Ukrainian Armor” with its advanced EW systems. This strategic partnership is set to bolster Ukraine’s defense capabilities and solidify Kvertus’ position in the EW market.

== Products of the company ==
=== Anti-drone guns ===
- KVERTUS AD G-6
- KVERTUS AD G–6+
- KVERTUS AD MW

=== Portable devices ===
- KVERTUS AD COUNTER FPV F2 М30
- KVERTUS AD COUNTER FPV
- KVERTUS AD HUNTER

=== Backpacks ===
- KVERTUS AD COUNTER FPV BACKPACK F2 M50
- KVERTUS AD COUNTER FPV BACKPACK F3 U
- KVERTUS AD COUNTER FPV BACKPACK
- KVERTUS AD KRAKEN COUNTER FPV F3 M30
- KVERTUS AD KRAKEN COUNTER FPV F4 M50
- KVERTUS AD KRAKEN-М
- KVERTUS AD KRAKEN–U
- KVERTUS AD KRAKEN-Е
- KVERTUS AD KRAKEN-А
- KVERTUS AD CHAOS
- KVERTUS MS AZIMUTH

=== Stationary complex of electronic warfare ===
- KVERTUS АD VEPR М50
- KVERTUS АD VEPR М
- KVERTUS AD VEPR M100 COUNTER FPV
- KVERTUS АD VEPR М100
- KVERTUS АD VEPR М100 GPS
